Bolton-le-Sands railway station served the village of Bolton-le-Sands, Lancashire, England, from 1847 to 1969 on the Lancaster and Carlisle Railway.

History 
The station opened as Bolton on 7 August 1847 by the Lancaster and Carlisle Railway. Its name was changed to Bolton-le-Sands in 1861 to avoid confusion with other stations of the same name that were open around this time. The station closed on 3 February 1969.
The footbridge survived until 2003.

References

External links 

Disused railway stations in Lancaster
Railway stations in Great Britain opened in 1847
Railway stations in Great Britain closed in 1969
1847 establishments in England
1969 disestablishments in England
Beeching closures in England
Former Lancaster and Carlisle Railway stations